Dudleya abramsii is a species complex of succulent plants native to California and parts of Baja California. There are numerous subspecies, some critically endangered, with varying habits and lifestyles, but most often characterized by a smaller size, yellow flowers, and an affinity for rocky habitats. The subspecies may be polyphyletic.

Description 
Dudleya abramsii is a fleshy perennial forming a small basal cluster of leaves around a central caudex. The habit of Dudleya abramsii is growing in either solitary rosettes or in caespitose forms. The thick, glaucous leaves are lance-oblong to lanceolate, reaching up to 11 centimeters in length, but often remaining much smaller, usually 2 to 30 mm long, and 3 to 20 mm wide. The entire rosette is generally only 0.5 to 15 cm wide. The inflorescence is a mostly erect, branching stem lined with pointed bracts and bearing up to 15 flowers. The inflorescence has a peduncle 2 to 25 cm tall, and 1 to 6 mm wide. The lower bracts are 4 to 40 mm large, and the pedicels are anywhere from 0.5 to 7 mm long. The flower has five small, thick sepals at the base of five pale to cream yellow petals each roughly 8 to 13 mm long. The keel of the flower is tinged with fine, purple to red lines.

Taxonomy 
There are several subspecies, and many former subspecies with differing recognition. Flora of North America and The Jepson Manual have elevated Dudleya parva to a species, while other subspecies have been moved to Dudleya cymosa

The following subspecies are recognized in the 2012 Jepson eFlora:
 Dudleya abramsii subsp. abramsii Rose (Abrams' liveforever)  – native to the Peninsular Ranges of California and Baja California. Syn. Dudleya tenuis.
 Dudleya abramsii subsp. affinis  K.M. Nakai (San Bernardino Mountains liveforever) – endemic to the San Bernardino Mountains near the edge of the Mojave Desert. Syn. Dudleya baldwinensis.
 Dudleya abramsii subsp. bettinae  (Hoover) Bartel (San Luis Obispo serpentine dudleya or Betty's liveforever) – endemic to the coastal serpentine of San Luis Obispo County, California.
Dudleya abramsii subsp. calcicola (Bartel & Shevock) K.M. Nakai (Limestone dudleya) – endemic to the southern Sierra Nevada. Syn. Dudleya calcicola 
 Dudleya abramsii subsp. murina  (Eastw.) Moran (San Luis Obispo or mouse-leaved dudleya) – endemic to coastal San Luis Obispo County
Dudleya abramsii subsp. setchellii (Jeps.) Moran (Santa Clara Valley liveforever) – endemic to the Santa Clara Valley. Formerly classified under D. cymosa.

Distribution and habitat 
D. abramsii is native to California and northern Baja California, where it grows in rocky areas in a number of habitat types.

References

External links
 Calflora: Dudleya abramsii (Abrams' dudleya,  Abrams' liveforever)
 Jepson Manual eFlora (TJM2) treatment of Dudleya abramsii — & subspecies links.
 USDA Plants Profile for Dudleya abramsii
 UC Photos gallery — Dudleya abramsii ssp. affinis
 UC Photos gallery — Dudleya abramsii ssp. parva

abramsii
Flora of California
Flora of Baja California
Flora of the California desert regions
Flora of the Sierra Nevada (United States)
Natural history of the California chaparral and woodlands
Natural history of the California Coast Ranges
Natural history of the Mojave Desert
Natural history of the Peninsular Ranges
Natural history of the San Francisco Bay Area
Natural history of the Santa Monica Mountains
Natural history of the Transverse Ranges
Taxa named by Joseph Nelson Rose